Stylidium oviflorum is a dicotyledonous plant that belongs to the genus Stylidium (family Stylidiaceae). The specific epithet oviflorum comes from the Latin ovi meaning egg and florus meaning flower, which refers to this species flower colouration that resembles a fried egg with bright yellow and pure white colours. It is an annual plant that grows from 6 to 26 cm tall. The linear or deltate leaves, about 3-11 per plant, are scattered along the stem and are generally 1.4–3 mm long and 0.25-0.6 mm wide. Petioles and scapes are absent. Inflorescences are 4–15 cm long and produce white and yellow flowers that bloom from April to August in the southern hemisphere. S. oviflorum is endemic to the northern area of Queensland from Mareeba and Wairuna west to Barwidgi. Its habitat is recorded as being sandy soils in seepage areas, on hillsides, or beside creeks in the company of Melaleuca viridiflora, Eucalyptus camaldulensis, or E. cullenii. S. oviflorum is most closely related to S. fissilobum but differs mostly in the corolla colour and self-supporting stems. Its conservation status has been assessed as data deficient.

See also 
 List of Stylidium species

References 

Carnivorous plants of Australia
Flora of Queensland
oviflorum
Plants described in 2000
Asterales of Australia